Sablayan, officially the Municipality of Sablayan,  is a 1st class municipality in the province of Occidental Mindoro, Philippines. According to the 2020 census, it has a population of 92,598 people.

It has a total land area of 2,188.80 square kilometers, making it the largest municipality in the Philippines. The Apo Reef, North and South Pandan Islands, and a portion of Mounts Iglit–Baco National Park are part of its jurisdiction.

History

The town used to be called Dongon, a coastal village located currently at Barangay San Nicolas. The first accounts of the baptism of the locals under the Recollects were recorded in 1670. By 1749, Dongon became the biggest pueblo in the whole island of Mindoro in terms of population.
 
In 1754, the Moro pirates started attacking the town, and almost every year thereafter, until in 1791 when the Moros effectively wiped out the whole population from more than 600 inhabitants to less than 98 people.

In 1814, the inhabitants of Dongon gradually transferred to the village of Sablayan, until Dongon ceased to become a village in 1829. In 1832, the missionary friar Simeon Mendoza de la V. de Ibernalo requested the Spanish government for the exemption of the town's inhabitants from paying taxes so that they could build a stone church, convent and fort at a hilly part of the village. The church that stands today at the town may have been built from 1832 to 1835, and its advocacy was placed under San Sebastian.

Geography
Sablayan is located in the central part of Occidental Mindoro. It is bounded to the north by the municipality of Santa Cruz and the municipalities of Baco, Naujan, Victoria and Socorro all in Oriental Mindoro province; to the east by the municipalities of Pinamalayan, Gloria, Bansud, Bongabong and Mansalay also in Oriental Mindoro; to the south by the municipality of Calintaan; and to the west by the Mindoro Strait.

Barangays

Sablayan is politically subdivided into 22 barangays. In 1957 the following barrios were renamed: Batasan to Claudio Salgado, Hinaya to Buhay na Bato (Batong Buhay) and Iriron to San Isidro.

 Batong Buhay
 Buenavista (town proper)
 Burgos
 Claudio Salgado
 General Emilio Aguinaldo
 Ibud
 Ilvita
 Ligaya
 Poblacion (Lumangbayan)
 Paetan
 Pag-Asa
 San Agustin
 San Francisco
 San Nicolas
 San Vicente
 Santa Lucia
 Santo Niño
 Tagumpay
 Victoria
 Lagnas
 Malisbong
 Tuban

Climate

Demographics

Economy

Government

List of former chief executives

Culture
Held once a year the Dugoy Festival is a celebration of the Mangyan culture.

References

External links

 Sablayan Profile at PhilAtlas.com
 [ Philippine Standard Geographic Code]
Philippine Census Information
Local Governance Performance Management System

Municipalities of Occidental Mindoro